Tomasz Magdziarz (born February 23, 1978) is a Polish footballer.

References

External links 
 

1978 births
Living people
Polish footballers
Lech Poznań players
Warta Poznań players
Footballers from Poznań
Association football midfielders